Sligo Abbey was a Dominican convent in Sligo, Ireland, founded in 1253. It was built in the Romanesque style with some later additions and alterations. Extensive ruins remain, mainly of the church and the cloister.

Name and location 
The name "Sligo Abbey" is the generally accepted traditional name, but strictly speaking "abbey" is inappropriate as Dominican monasteries are led by priors not abbots: "convent", "friary", or "priory" would be more correct. The community was dedicated to the Holy Cross. The ruins are located in Abbey Street, Sligo, but when it was still functioning, the convent lay outside the town's limits and its location was then usually described as "near Sligo".

History 
Sligo Abbey, was a Dominican Friary, founded in 1253 by Maurice FitzGerald, 2nd Lord of Offaly, who was Justiciar of Ireland from 1232 to 1245. His purpose allegedly was to house a community of monks to pray for the soul of Richard Marshal, 3rd Earl of Pembroke, whom he was rumoured to have killed. The Dominicans were a poor choice for such a task as their specialty is preaching rather than praying. FitzGerald built a substantial Norman abbey, with all the essential parts and endowed it with lands.

In 1414 the buildings were damaged in an accidental fire. The abbey did not have sufficient means for the reconstruction and appealed to the pope for help. At that moment three men competed with each other in the Vatican Standoff: Benedict XIII was pope in Avignon, Gregory XII in Rome, and John XXIII in Pisa. As England supported John, this was the pope the abbey addressed. Their letter reached John at the Council of Constance (1414–1418). John replied by sending an apostolic letter from Constance granting indulgences of ten years to all who would visit the church on the feast of the Assumption and the day of Saint Patrick and contribute to its restoration. The friary was rebuilt in 1416 by Prior Brian, son of Dermot MacDonagh, tanist (prince) of Tirerrill and Collooney. There were 20 friars at the abbey at that time.

When the Dissolution of the Irish monasteries that had started in 1530 in the Pale, began to menace monasteries in the West of Ireland, Donogh O'Connor Sligo in 1568 obtained a letter from Queen Elizabeth that exempted Sligo Abbey on condition that the friars would become secular priests.

During Tyrone's Rebellion (1594–1603) the abbey was damaged when George Bingham, brother of Richard Bingham, president of Connaught, besieged Sligo Castle in 1595, which was held by Hugh Roe O'Donnell's men. After the war, at the beginning of the 17th century, the abbey and its lands were given to Sir William Taaffe in consideration of his services to Queen Elizabeth. Sir William was the grandfather of Theobald Taaffe, 1st Earl of Carlingford.

In 1608 only one friar was left in the abbey, Father O'Duane, who died in this year. However, Father Daniel O'Crean arrived from Spain before O'Duane's death and built up a new community,  succeeding so well that in 1627 Ross MacGeoghegan, provincial of the Dominical Order in Ireland, held a provincial chapter in Sligo.

During the Irish Confederate Wars (1641–1653) the convent was attacked and burned by Sir Frederick Hamilton in the summer of 1642. Some of the friars were killed.

In 1697 when King William reigned alone, the Irish Parliament passed the Banishment Act, which specified that all ordinaries (bishops) and regular clergy (e.g. monks) must leave the country before 1 May 1698. It did not affect the parish priests, who are classified as secular priests. The Dominicans of Sligo left Ireland for Spain, led by their prior, Father Patrick McDonogh. The abbey stood then empty.

In the 18th century some friars came back to Sligo and stayed in the abbey. In 1760 when Father Lawrence Connellan returned from Louvain to Sligo, he found that the buildings had deteriorated so far that it was necessary to find other accommodation. In 1783 he obtained a lease in High Street and moved there. In the second half of the 18th century, the friars built a chapel in Pound Street. In 1803 a new friary was built. In 1846 Father B. J. Goodman, prior of the friary and provincial of the order, built the Neogothic Holy Cross Church in High Street, and in 1865 another residence for the friars was built behind that church in Dominick Street.

The abbey grounds were used as cemetery. The buildings were quarried for reusable stone. In 1893 Evelyn Ashley, to whom the abbey had come from Lord Palmerston, vested part of it in the Board of Works and the rest followed in 1913, donated by his son Wilfrid William Ashley. The Board then did work on the ruins, freeing them from ivy, bushes and trees growing on it.

Architecture 
The abbey ruins consist of the walls of the church, inclusive those of the tower, three sides of the cloister, and remains of the sacristy, the chapter room, the refectory, and the dormitories. Most of the buildings seem to date from the 13th century, the time of the monastery's foundation and were built in a late romanesque or more specifically Norman Style. In the 15th century late Gothic additions and replacements were made and some others in the 16th century.

The church was never vaulted and, having lost its wooden roof, stands open to the sky. The church is divided into the choir (or chancel) in the east and the nave in the west by the 15th-century cut-stone rood screen, that consisted of a gallery across the church supported by ribbed groin vaults, three bays wide and one deep. This rood screen has been partially reconstructed from its surviving right and left abutments in the abbey's latest restoration (see photo).

The tower is another 15th-century addition. It is thick-walled and square. It is placed on the main axis of the church just east of the rood screen and suspended over the church by the means of two lofty pointed and profiled arches forming an archway or tunnel that connects the two parts of the church. The underside of the tower is closed by a ribbed and groined fan vault. The tower has a door on its north side that was reached over the roof. With the roof gone, the tower has become inaccessible. The tower resembles those of Kilcrea Friary, Muckross Abbey, Quin Abbey, and Rosserk Friary, but none of those is as daringly suspended.

The church's east end is square. The terminal wall holds a large late-Gothic window divided into four lights by mullions. Its head is filled with reticular tracery. This window must have replaced one or several Romanesque windows in the 15th century. In front of this window stands the table of the high altar, the front of which is divided into nine panels decorated with late-gothic cusped arches and foliage in relief. This altar also dates from the Late Gothic.

The nave has the same width as the choir. Its western façade has been destroyed so that the western end of the church stands open. On the southern side the nave was accompanied by an aisle and a one-armed transept (or lateral chapel). Both are later additions. The aisle has been entirely demolished and the transept partially, so that the arcade, consisting of three pointed arches supported by octagonal pillars, is exposed. The transept once held two altars. The naves of Kilcrea Friary, Muckross Abbey, Quin Abbey, and Rosserk Friary have similar one-armed transepts.

The cloister lies to the north of the church as is also the case at Kilcrea Friary, Moyne Abbey, Muckross Abbey, Quin Abbey, and Rosserk Friary. The cloister's southern walk runs along the northern wall of the church's nave. Only three sides of the cloister remain standing; the western side has been demolished. The cloister walk is covered with rubble barrel vaults. Its arcades are supported by slender pillars reminiscent of double columns. The arches of the arcades and the barrel vaults are slightly pointed. The cloisters of Moyne Abbey and Quin Abbey have similar pillars and vaults. Despite of its Romanesque appearance the cloister is attributed to the 15th century.

The sacristy, vestry, and chapter room are in the ground floor of the east range. Excepted the western extension of the chapter room, they are part of the 13th-century core of the abbey. They are covered with rubble barrel vaults similar to those of the cloister. The refectory occupied the first floor of the north range. Only its southern wall above the arcade of the cloister is preserved. From this wall protrudes a ruined oriel window giving light to the reader's desk where a friar would read aloud from the scriptures during mealtimes.

Monuments 
The church contains two noteworthy funeral monuments: the "O'Craian altar tomb" and the mural in remembrance of "Sir Donogh O'Connor Sligo". O'Craian's tomb is the oldest surviving monument in the church. Its Latin inscription dates it from 1506 and states that it is the tomb of Cormac O'Craian (or Crean) and his wife Johanna, daughter of Ennis (or Magennis). It fills a niche in the northern wall of the nave next to the rood screen. It consists of a stone table, similar to the altar in the choir, and a canopy consisting of a high pointed arch with tracery. The style is late Gothic.

The O'Connor mural is on the wall of the choir to the right of the altar. It shows reliefs of O'Connor and his wife kneeling in prayer in an architectural frame, decorated with heraldic and religious motives. Sir Donogh O'Connor obtained the letter from Queen Elizabeth that saved the abbey from dissolution, mentioned above. He died in 1609. His wife, Eleanor Butler, daughter of Lord Dunboyne, erected the monument in 1624 in a late Renaissance style. Before O'Connor she had been married to Gerald FitzGerald, 14th Earl of Desmond, who was killed in 1583.

In popular culture 
Sligo Abbey appears in two short stories by William Butler Yeats: The Crucifixion of the Outcast and The Curse of the Fires and of the Shadows. In both stories, the head of the monastery is called the abbot. It is also the subject of what is possibly the oldest surviving painting of any building in Ireland.

See also 
List of abbeys and priories in Ireland (County Sligo)

Notes

References

External links
http://monastic.ie/history/sligo-dominican-priory/
http://heritageireland.ie/visit/places-to-visit/sligo-abbey/ – Official site at Heritage Ireland
http://irishantiquities.bravehost.com/sligo/sligo/sligofriary.html – Sligo Friary on the Irish Antiquities website
http://www.ecclesiasticalireland.org/sligo/index.htm – Sligo Abbey on the Ecclesiastical Ireland website

1253 establishments in Ireland
13th-century establishments in Ireland
Archaeological sites in County Sligo
Buildings and structures in County Sligo
Christian monasteries established in the 13th century
Culdees
Dominican monasteries in Ireland
National Monuments in County Sligo
Religious museums in Ireland
Religious organizations established in the 1250s
Roman Catholic churches in County Sligo
Ruins in Ireland